Elections to the Volksraad were held in the Dutch East Indies in 1927.

Electoral system
The Volksraad had a total of 60 members, 37 of which were elected and 21 appointed. Seats were also assigned to ethnic groups, with 30 for the Dutch population (15 elected, 15 appointed), 25 for the native population (19 elected, 4 appointed) and five for the Chinese population (3 elected, 2 appointed).

Results

References

1927 elections in Asia
1927
1927 in the Dutch East Indies